Abhijit Guha is a retired lieutenant general of the Indian Army and the head of the UN Mission to Support the Hodeidah Agreement (UNMHA) in Yemen.

Education 
Guha graduated from the National Defence College, the Defence Services Staff College, and the College of Combat.

Career 

During 1992–1993 in Cambodia, he was part of the United Nations Transitional Authority as a military observer.

Between 2009 and 2013, he was the military adviser at the Office of Military Affairs of the United Nations Department of Peacekeeping Operations. He retired from the Indian Army in 2013 as a lieutenant general. After retirement, he was a part of the Expert Panel on the 2014 Technology and Innovation in UN Peacekeeping and the 2015 High Level Independent Panel on Peace Operations. He has participated in United Nations’ investigations in the Middle East and Africa.

In September 2019, Guha became the Head of the UN Mission to Support the Hodeidah Agreement (UNMHA) and the Chair of the Redeployment Coordination Committee in Yemen.

References 

Lieutenant generals
Indian Army officers
United Nations peacekeeping
Living people
Year of birth missing (living people)
National Defence College, India alumni
Academic staff of the National Defence College, India
Defence Services Staff College alumni